Lamotialnini is a tribe of cicadas in the family Cicadidae. There are about 19 genera and at least 90 described species in Lamotialnini, occurring worldwide except South America.

Genera
These 19 genera belong to the tribe Lamotialnini:

 Abricta Stål, 1866 c g
 Abroma Stål, 1866 i c g
 Aleeta Moulds, 2003 c g
 Allobroma Duffels, 2011 c g
 Chrysolasia Moulds, 2003 i c g
 Hylora Boulard, 1971 c g
 Lamotialna Boulard, 1976 c g
 Lemuriana Distant, 1905 g
 Magicicada Davis, 1925 i c g b (periodical cicadas)
 Monomatapa Distant, 1879 c g
 Musimoia China, 1929 c g
 Neomuda Distant, 1920 c g
 Oudeboschia Distant, 1920 c g
 Panka Distant, 1905 c g
 Sundabroma Duffels, 2011 c g
 Trismarcha Karsch, 1891 c g
 Tryella Moulds, 2003 c g
 Unduncus Duffels, 2011 c g
 Viettealna Boulard, 1980 c g - Madagascar

Data sources: i = ITIS, c = Catalogue of Life, g = GBIF, b = Bugguide.net

References

Further reading

External links

 

 
Cicadettinae
Hemiptera tribes